Trypeticus is a genus of beetles belonging to the family Histeridae.

Taxonomy
In 1984, Marseul described the genus as a division of the Neotropical genus Trypanaeus described by Eschscholtz in 1829. Then he included many Indo-malayan Archipelago species based on differently shaped mesosternum. However his most works were described by stating the genus as a subgenus within Trypanaeus. Then in 1916, Bickhardt gave a solid basis for Trypeticus as separate genus and formed the separate subfamily Trypeticinae. Between 1920 and 1930, the forestry entomologist L.G.E. Kalshoven collected several species of the genus on Java and Sumatra which are currently preserved in The Nationaal Natuurhistorisch Museum at Leiden. In 1999, Slipinski and Mazur removed the subfamily Trypeticinae into the synonymy of Trypanaeinae.

Distribution
The species are distributed throughout Indo-China, Malayan peninsula, the entire Indo-Malayan Archipelago including the Philippines, New Guinea, Northern Queensland, Taiwan, Southeast China, Korea, and Japan as well as Indian subcontinent, Sri Lanka and Nepal.

Description
Primarily oligophagous, if not monophagous, the beetles depend on xylophagous prey species. Adults show strong sexual dimorphism. The males show great variations with a more or less thick-set body form. However, females are fairly uniform in body form, so can be detect possible patterns of distribution or patterns of diversification. Adults have a cylindrical body form, peculiar tibiae with very long tarsi. The clypeus is more or less prolonged into a rostrum. The antennal flagellum consists of six segments of more or less subconical form. In the resting position, beetle laid down through deep incisions in the anterior prosternal margin of the antennal flagelli. They also can deflect the head and retract it for the greater part into the prothorax. The posterior margin of the prosternum is transverse or at most slightly emarginate.

Biology
Adult beetles live in the burrows of bark beetles and other wood-boring insects. They can be collected easily by using flight interception traps.

Species
 
 Trypeticus adebratti Kanaar, 2003
 Trypeticus albertisii (Gestro, 1875)
 Trypeticus alticola Kanaar, 2003
 Trypeticus andaiensis (Gestro, 1875)
 Trypeticus angustifrons Kanaar, 2003
 Trypeticus arriagadai Kanaar, 2003
 Trypeticus aukei Kanaar, 2003
 Trypeticus beesoni Desbordes, 1922
 Trypeticus bertiae Kanaar, 2003
 Trypeticus bombacis (Lewis, 1885)
 Trypeticus boukei Kanaar, 2003
 Trypeticus brevis Kanaar, 2003
 Trypeticus canalifrons Bickhardt, 1913
 Trypeticus capillatus Kanaar, 2003
 Trypeticus carinifrons Kanaar, 2003
 Trypeticus carinipygus Kanaar, 2003
 Trypeticus caterinoi Kanaar, 2003
 Trypeticus cinctipygus (Marseul, 1864)
 Trypeticus clarus Kanaar, 2003
 Trypeticus convexicollis Kanaar, 2003
 Trypeticus coomani Kanaar, 2003
 Trypeticus crassus Schmidt, 1892
 Trypeticus danielssoni Kanaar, 2003
 Trypeticus degallieri Kanaar, 2003
 Trypeticus deoudei Kanaar, 2003
 Trypeticus dohertyi (Lewis, 1891)
 Trypeticus fagi (Lewis, 1884)
 Trypeticus ferrarii (Gestro, 1875)
 Trypeticus fissirostrum Zhang & Zhou, 2007
 Trypeticus foveicollis Kanaar, 2003
 Trypeticus frontalis Schmidt, 1897
 Trypeticus gestroi (Marseul, 1879)
 Trypeticus gibberosus Kanaar, 2003
 Trypeticus gilolous (Marseul, 1864)
 Trypeticus gomyi Kanaar, 2003
 Trypeticus gracilis Kanaar, 2003
 Trypeticus gratus Kanaar, 2003
 Trypeticus grouvellei Marseul, 1883
 Trypeticus hamatipygus Kanaar, 2003
 Trypeticus helleri Bickhardt, 1918
 Trypeticus hielkemaorum Kanaar, 2003
 Trypeticus hinei Kanaar, 2003
 Trypeticus houseae Kanaar, 2003
 Trypeticus huijbregtsi Kanaar, 2003
 Trypeticus immanis Kanaar, 2003
 Trypeticus incilis Lewis, 1897
 Trypeticus indicus Lewis, 1893
 Trypeticus jaegeri Kanaar, 2003
 Trypeticus jelmeri Kanaar, 2003
 Trypeticus jorisi Kanaar, 2003
 Trypeticus kalemantanus (Marseul, 1864)
 Trypeticus kalshoveni Kanaar, 2003
 Trypeticus kapleri Kanaar, 2003
 Trypeticus kirtoni Kanaar, 2003
 Trypeticus lackneri Kanaar, 2003
 Trypeticus latilabris Kanaar, 2003
 Trypeticus latirostrum Kanaar, 2003
 Trypeticus latisternum Kanaar, 2003
 Trypeticus loebli Kanaar, 2003
 Trypeticus longicollis Heller, 1915
 Trypeticus mazuri Kanaar, 2003
 Trypeticus merkli Kanaar, 2003
 Trypeticus minutissimus Kanaar, 2003
 Trypeticus minutulus Lewis, 1891
 Trypeticus mirandus Kanaar, 2003
 Trypeticus monteithi Kanaar, 2003
 Trypeticus nasicus Kanaar, 2003
 Trypeticus nemorivagus Lewis, 1892
 Trypeticus nepalensis Kanaar, 2003
 Trypeticus nitens Kanaar, 2003
 Trypeticus obeliscus Lewis, 1891
 Trypeticus parilloi Kanaar, 2003
 Trypeticus parobeliscus Kanaar, 2003
 Trypeticus pederseni Kanaar, 2003
 Trypeticus penatii Kanaar, 2003
 Trypeticus penicillicauda Kanaar, 2003
 Trypeticus planisternus Lewis, 1897
 Trypeticus poggii Kanaar, 2003
 Trypeticus pooti Kanaar, 2003
 Trypeticus protractus Kanaar, 2003
 Trypeticus rectangulus Kanaar, 2003
 Trypeticus riedeli Kanaar, 2003
 Trypeticus rombauti Kanaar, 2003
 Trypeticus rostricauda Kanaar, 2003
 Trypeticus rostripygus Bickhardt, 1912
 Trypeticus sanneae Kanaar, 2003
 Trypeticus sauteri Bickhardt, 1913
 Trypeticus schawalleri Kanaar, 2003
 Trypeticus silvicola Schmidt, 1897
 Trypeticus smetanai Kanaar, 2003
 Trypeticus subobeliscus Kanaar, 2003
 Trypeticus sulcisternum Kanaar, 2003
 Trypeticus tabacigliscens Marseul, 1883
 Trypeticus therondi Kanaar, 2003
 Trypeticus trigonifrons Kanaar, 2003
 Trypeticus tuberculinotum Kanaar, 2003
 Trypeticus uhligi Kanaar, 2003
 Trypeticus valens Kanaar, 2003
 Trypeticus vanasseni Kanaar, 2003
 Trypeticus veda (Lewis, 1885)
 Trypeticus venator (Lewis, 1884)
 Trypeticus viennai Kanaar, 2003
 Trypeticus yunnanensis Zhang & Zhou, 2007

References

Histeridae
Beetle genera